The .25 Short (also called the .25 Bacon & Bliss) is a  American rimfire handgun cartridge.

Introduced for the F. D. Bliss revolver in 1860, it was also available in a number of other inexpensive weapons of the period. It was never offered as a rifle caliber.

Its power is comparable to the black powder loadings of the .22 Long Rifle. It was available from both Remington and Winchester.

The round continued to be commercially available until 1920, but is now considered a collectible.

See also
List of cartridges by caliber
List of handgun cartridges
List of rimfire cartridges
6 mm caliber

References

Notes
Barnes, Frank C., ed. by John T. Amber. ".25 Short", in Cartridges of the World, pp. 276, 282, & 283. Northfield, IL: DBI Books, 1972. .

Rimfire cartridges